North Houston is an Unincorporated community in Harris County, Texas, United States that used to be a distinct community.

Government and infrastructure 
The area is served by Harris County Sheriff's Office District I Patrol, headquartered from the Cypresswood Substation at 6831 Cypresswood Drive. The 249 Storefront is located at 7614 Fallbrook Drive in the North Houston community.

Education 
Cyfair Independent School District

References

External links 

Unincorporated communities in Harris County, Texas
Unincorporated communities in Texas